The Chief of Defence (Forsvarssjefen) is the highest-ranking officer of the Norwegian Armed Forces, second only to the King of Norway. Even though he holds the same rank as the King of Norway, according to the Norwegian Constitution the King holds the highest command of the Army, Air Force, Navy and Home Guard.

The Chief of Defence is the top advisor to the Government regarding military issues. He is responsible for carrying out the mission the King or Minister of Defence gives to the Military. He is also Norway's representative to NATO's military committee.

The post was first established in 1940, and is currently held by General Eirik Kristoffersen.

List of Chiefs of Defence

References and footnotes

 
Norway